Frank Samia (born 9 October 1981) is an Australian-born former professional rugby league footballer who represented Lebanon. His position of choice was at centre.

Samia played in the lower grades for the St George Illawarra Dragons.

References 

1981 births
Living people
Australian rugby league players
Australian people of Lebanese descent
Lebanon national rugby league team players
Rugby league centres